Osny is a commune in the Val-d'Oise department, in the northwestern suburbs of Paris, France.

Population

Transportation

Osny is served by Osny station on the Transilien Paris-Saint-Lazare suburban rail line.

Education
Schools include:
Six public preschools (maternelles): Charcot, Lameth, La Ravinière, Les Vignes, Paul Roth, Yves Le Guern
Six public elementary schools: d'Immarmont, La Ravinière, Lameth, Paul Roth, Saint-Exupéry, and Yves Le Guern
Two private preschools and primary schools: École élémentaire Les Petits Pas and École maternelle et primaire du Petit Prince (Protestant school)
One public junior high school (collège): la Bruyère
Collège Nicolas-Flamel is in nearby Pontoise; some Osny students go there since not everyone may be assigned to the junior high in Osny.
One private junior high school: Collège Saint-Stanislas
Two public senior high schools: Lycée Polyvalent Paul-Émile Victor and L’Institut de formation par alternance (IFA) Adolphe Chauvin
One private senior high school: Lycée professionnel des industries graphiques « Notre famille »

See also
Communes of the Val-d'Oise department

References

External links

Official website 

Communes of Val-d'Oise
Cergy-Pontoise